Mary French Sheldon (10 May 1847 –  10 February 1936), as author May French Sheldon, was an American author and explorer.

Early years and education
Mary French was born May 10, 1847, at Bridgewater, Pennsylvania. Her father was Joseph French, a civil engineer, and her mother Elizabeth J. French (née Poorman), a spiritualist who later practiced "galvanic medicine" in Boston, as did her sister, Dr. Belle French Patterson.

She was educated in the United States and overseas, studying art and developing into an author and ethnologist.

Career
In 1876, she married an American, Eli Lemon Sheldon (1848-1892), a banker and author, and they moved to London where they established publishing firms.

Sheldon is noted as a translator of Flaubert's Salammbô, and was the author of papers and essays. As a writer, Sheldon wrote a number of novels, short stories, and essays.

She acquired fame for an expedition. In 1891, inspired by the activities of Henry Morton Stanley, who was a family friend, she left London for Africa. Her travels were sponsored by Sir Alfred Jones, who had been directed by King Leopold of Belgium to find a way to dampen British criticism of human rights abuses in the Congo. While in the Congo, she traveled on steamboats owned by the state and its company allies, who controlled where she went and what she saw.

When she returned to England, Jones helped place her articles in newspapers. She stated "I have witnessed more atrocities in London streets than I have ever seen in the Congo." She gave a presentation/slide show for an audience of five hundred at the Savoy Hotel in London, with expenses paid by King Leopold. Thereafter, the king paid her a monthly salary to lobby members of Parliament.

She obtained assistance from African peoples as she explored around Lake Chala. Her journey from Mombassa to Mount Kilimanjaro caused a sensation because she was not accompanied by a white companion (although she was hardly unaccompanied - she had 150 Zanzibari porters and guides). She returned with ethnographic materials, wrote on her experience, and undertook a lecture tour.

French Sheldon received multiple awards for her exhibition at the World's Columbian Exposition, and was appointed membership in societies such as the Writer's Club and the Anthropological Society of Washington. She was made a fellow of the Royal Geographical Society, among the first fifteen women to receive this honour, in November 1892.

She died in London on 10 February 1936, with a funeral at Golders Green Crematorium.

References

Sources

External links
 African Women Bibliographic Database

1847 births
1936 deaths
19th-century American novelists
19th-century American women writers
19th-century American translators
American expatriates in the United Kingdom
American explorers
American women novelists
Explorers of Africa
Female explorers
Novelists from Pennsylvania
People from Beaver County, Pennsylvania